Trinity High School (also known as Euless Trinity in sports) is a public high school in Euless, Texas.  The school serves grade levels 10–12 and is a part of the Hurst-Euless-Bedford Independent School District.

The school is named "Trinity" as an homage to the three cities comprised by the school district in which it is located: Hurst, Euless, and Bedford (and also as a reference to the nearby Trinity River, which forms the southern border of the school district). The school's mascot is a Trojan. The Trinity High School football team has won the Texas 5A Division 1 State Championship three times (2005, 2007, 2009).

Trinity High School is also notable as the most diverse public high school in Texas and the fifth most diverse public high school in the country. In 2017, the school was rated "Met Standard" by the Texas Education Agency, with a 5-Star Distinction for Academic Achievements in ELA/Reading, Mathematics, Science, Social Studies, and Post Secondary Readiness.

History

Trinity was established as the second high school in the Hurst-Euless-Bedford Independent School District.  (The first high school being L.D. Bell High School, which opened in 1957 in Euless and moved to its current site in Hurst in 1965.) The campus sits on a hillside in west central Euless, less than 500 feet from the Euless-Bedford city limit.

Campus

Trinity High School is made up of eleven distinct buildings, most of which are named for the department they house (often abbreviated to just the first letter).  The nine original buildings were: the Fine Arts Building, the Academics Building, the Library, the Science Building, the Physical Education Building, the Cafeteria, the Driver's Education Building, a small two-story building called D-Building, and an Administration Building.  The Physical Education building formerly included a natatorium that was mothballed and eventually demolished in the 2010s. The late 1990s brought three major changes to the campus: a system of covered walkways was built to connect most of the school's buildings, a new band hall was added to the Fine Arts Building, and a wing was added to the Academics Building.  This new wing became the new face of the campus because of its large and prominent façade and provided new offices for the principal, assistant principals, and secretaries. The original Administration Building was converted to house the counselors' offices.

In the first few years of the new millennium, two new buildings were added to the Trinity campus.  The two-story N-Building lies on the campus's southern edge and houses the Foreign Language Department and many classes of and the office of the coordinator of the International Baccalaureate program.  Just a little further into campus from the D-Building is the new W-Building.  The W-Building houses special education classrooms and is specifically designed to accommodate the needs of students with physical disabilities. An activity center named for former principal B.J. Murray opened in 2013 with a 70-yard indoor field, offices, locker rooms, and a weight room dedicated after Trinity alum Ryan McBean. The center is colloquially referred to as "the Mac".

Student body
During the 2016–2017 school year, Trinity High School enrolled 2,574 students in grade 10 (34.4%), grade 11 (34.0%), and grade 12 (31.6%).  Ethnicities represented include white (31.3%), Hispanic (29.2%), African-Americans (21.4%), Asian and Pacific Islander (9.9%), Native Hawaiians and Pacific Islander (3.2%), two or more races (4.3%), and Native American (0.8%). Forty-eight percent were economically disadvantaged.

Euless is home to one of the largest Tongan populations outside of Tonga; the school is known for welcoming and celebrating students from diverse backgrounds. One of the school's most visible cultural celebrations is the varsity football team's performance of the Sipi Tau before and after each game.

Trinity High School receives students from three feeder schools: all students from Euless Junior High school and Harwood Junior High school attend Trinity along with roughly half of the students from Central Junior High school. Students in the attendance zones for Bell Manor, Lakewood, Meadow Creek, Midway Park, North Euless, Oakwood Terrace, Shady Brook, South Euless, Spring Garden, Viridian, and Wilshire elementary schools attend Trinity High School.

The State of Texas defined "college readiness," or readiness to undergo university studies, by scores on the ACT and SAT and in the 11th grade Texas Assessment of Knowledge and Skills (TAKS) tests. Holly Hacker of The Dallas Morning News said that the school was "high-performing" in that regard.

Academics

Among Tarrant County high schools, Trinity High School ranks eighth (of forty-six) in average points above passing on the 11th grade TAKS test.

On The Washington Post's 2016 list of America's most challenging high schools, Trinity High School is ranked 1497th out of approximately 22,000 public high schools, based on a ratio of 1.886 college-level exams taken per graduate. Using similar criteria, the school was ranked 304th in the nation (and 6th within Tarrant County) on Newsweek's 2007 list of the top 1,200 high schools in the country

Among Trinity's class of 2016, the average Old SAT score was 1442 (Texas state average was 1375), and the average ACT score was 21.8 (Texas state average was 20.3). In 2016, the school had 7 National Merit semifinalists and 2 semifinalists in 2017.

Trinity High School is an International Baccalaureate World School.  The program graduated its first group of seniors in 2004.

Athletics

Trinity High School has been ranked in the top 1% of "Best High Schools Sports" at the local, state-wide, and national levels. Trinity hosts its home football games at Pennington Field, which they also share with L.D. Bell High School. Most athletic activity at Trinity occurs in the "P" building, as well as the activity center.

Achievements

Currently playing in Texas 6A Division 1 American football, the Trinity Trojan football team has earned 28 Texas State Playoff appearances, including 23 District Championships, seven semifinal appearances, 5 state championship appearances, and three state titles.
The Boys' Tennis team succeeded in taking the 4A All-District Title in 1978, defeating L.D. Bell with a Finals match between Trinity's Robert Matuszewski and L.D. Bell's Tom Ferris.
The Girls' Soccer team reached the State Playoffs in 1992, 1993, 1994, 1995, 1996, 1999, 2000, 2001, 2005, 2006, 2007, 2008, 2009, 2011, 2012, 2013, and 2014. They have also won the NSCAA Team Academic Award in 2005 and 2006.
The Boys' Soccer team reached the State Playoffs in 1986, 1996, 1999, 2001, 2002, 2003, 2004, 2007, 2008, 2010, 2011, 2012, 2013, 2018 and 2019.
The Girls' Basketball team has earned playoff spots 17 times in the past 20 seasons, including a 33–2 record in 2002. They became the Area Champions in 2007.
The Boys' Basketball team were the 1996 State Runners-Up.
The Boys' Gymnastics team won State Championships in 1990 and 2002.
The Girls' Lacrosse team won the Div. II State Championship on May 6, 2007. They entered the tournament ranked second and defeated the defending div. II champions (9-8).

Fine arts

Band program
Mr. William D. Reavis was the first director of bands and fine arts at Trinity from its inception, a position he held until 1972. Before the school's opening, he composed the music and words for Trinity's alma mater and fight song. The band quickly became successful, continually winning sweepstakes at UIL competitions. In January 1972, Trinity's symphonic band was invited to represent the United States by Mexico's Department of Cultural Exchange, performing at Three Rivers High School before playing three concerts in Monterrey, Mexico.

The band continues to participate in UIL competitions, where the band continues a tradition of performance. In 2017, they resumed membership in Bands of America and participated in the Super-Regional Championship in Atlanta at the new Mercedes-Benz Stadium, where they placed 15th.

Drama

The Trinity Drama Department has also had its share of success, advancing to the State finals for UIL One Act Play in 1987, 1990, 1991, and 1992. They won the State Championship in 1992.

Photography

The Trinity Photography Department is a 6 time State Champion program. In 2008 Trinity had at least 9 finalists in the Best of College Photo Contest. At the Texas A&M Photo Shootout and the Association of Texas Photography Instructors Winter Conference in Arlington the Trojans brought home 33 awards. In 2008 alone the Trinity Photo Department won over 100 awards. They also had a special appearance in the nationally broadcast Dallas Cowboys End of Year Special in 2008. The Trinity Photography Department won State Championships in 1996, 1997, 1999, 2002, 2005, and 2019.

Choir

The Trinity Choir program has seen success after success in National Competitions and at home.  In 2007, the Trinity High School Choirs won 10 out of the 11 awards at the Disney Festival and received Sweepstakes ratings in the UIL Competition. The show choir, Harmony, is a 14-16 member auditioned ensemble and perform throughout the Metroplex including places such as The Mansion on Turtle Creek, the Nationalization Ceremony for immigrants, and the Ft. Worth Petroleum Club.

Yearbook

Trinity's Triune Yearbook has received National Awards for its 2007 publication. Including the Gold Medalist from the Columbia Scholastic Press Association, the highest ranking category. They have been nominated to receive the prestigious CSPA Crown Award presented only to the top 30 yearbooks in the Nation. They received the All-American rating with 5 marks of Distinction from the National Press Association, the NSPA's highest ranking. Triune has been selected as an elite NSPA Pacemaker Finalist recognizing the top 25 books nationally. They have also been selected by Taylor Publishing as a top 5% outstanding yearbook that will be shared with yearbook staffs around the country.

Trojan Crew
Formerly called Trojan Men, the now co-educational Trojan Crew waves the schools banner during football games, the school scores a touchdown, the Crew runs the letter flags and Nike flags down the field in support, raising the spirits of the players and the student section.

Notable alumni

Championships

References

External links

Trinity High School Official Website

Hurst-Euless-Bedford Independent School District high schools
Euless, Texas
International Baccalaureate schools in Texas
Educational institutions established in 1968